Kochetkov is a Russian masculine surname, its feminine counterpart is Kochetkova. It may refer to

Aleksandr Sergeevich Kochetkov (1900–1953), Soviet poet, writer and translator
Aleksandr Kochetkov (footballer, born 1933), Russian football player and coach
Aleksey Kochetkov (born 1971), Russian political scientist, publicist, international expert
Denis Kochetkov, Russian professional ice hockey forward
Dina Kochetkova (born 1977), Russian gymnast
Maria Kochetkova (born 1984), Russian ballet dancer
Nikolay Kochetkov (1915–2005), Soviet chemist and academician
Olga Kochetkova (born 1979), Russian swimmer
Pavel Kochetkov (born 1986), Russian cyclist, member of Team Katusha
Sergey Kochetkov (born 1973), Russian fencer

Russian-language surnames